Hallerstraße station is a metro station served by Hamburg U-Bahn line U1. It is located in Rotherbaum, in the Hamburg borough of Eimsbüttel was opened in 1929.

Location 
The station is located at the intersection of Rothenbaumchaussee, one of Hamburg's major thoroughfares, and Hallerstraße, famous for the tennis park complex Am Rothenbaum, venue of the annual German Open Tennis Championships. The street junction itself is also defined by the Rotherbaum Multimedia Centre, a large office complex designed by Norman Foster and completed in 1999.

See also 

 List of Hamburg U-Bahn stations

Gallery

References

External links 

 Hallerstraße at Hamburger-untergrundbahn.de 
 Pictures of Hallerstraße U-Bahn Station
 Line and route network plans at hvv.de 

Hamburg U-Bahn stations in Hamburg
Buildings and structures in Eimsbüttel
U1 (Hamburg U-Bahn) stations
Hamburg Hallerstr
Hamburg Hallerstr